Volkan Konak (born 27 February 1967) is a Turkish folk singer. His song "Cerrahpaşa" was a great success and his album, Mora, released in 2006, was awarded a gold plaque by the Turkish recording producers association, MÜ-YAP.

Albums
1989: Suların Horon Yeri
1993: Efulim
1994: Gelir misin Benimle?
1996: Volkanik Parçalar
1998: Pedaliza
2000: Şimal Rüzgarı
2003: Maranda
2006: Mora
2009: Mimoza
2012: Lifor
2015: Manolya
2017: Klasikler 1
2019: Dalya

References

External links
 Official web site

1967 births
Living people
People from Maçka
Turkish singer-songwriters
Istanbul Technical University alumni